New Epsilon TV is a private regional television station. Its headquarters are based in Peristeri, Attica.

History

E Channel
E Channel started operating on Wednesday, September 11, 2013, replacing 902 TV, bought by Vrionis. In 2017, the channel was sold to Ivan Savvidis and replaced by Open TV.

AB Channel
The channel operated by Star Hellenic Radio Television SA was initially known as Shop TV, and was owned by Telemarketing. On December 15, 2011, it was replaced with a Greek version of Body In Balance. One year later, it was bought by Kiopra Commercial Ltd., and journalist Makis Triantafyllopoulos, as programming from the newly established programming block called GR, would take up most of BIB's schedule. The channel, was renamed to Zoom TV on March 19, 2013, and was the main one to host the block, also managed by Triantafyllopoulos, which would be also hosted by local television stations throughout Greece:

Archipelagos TV (Lesbos, Chios and Samos) out of service
ΑRT (Tripoli)
Astra TV (Thessaly)
Channel 4U now Notos TV (Crete)
Corfu Channel (Corfu)
CreteTV (Heraklion)
Delta TV (Evros)
Diktyo 1 (Kastoria)
Dion TV (Thessaloniki and Pieria)
ENA Channel (Kavala)
ENA TV (Lamia)
FLASH TV (Western Macedonia)
Ionian Channel (Zakynthos)
Irida TV (Rhodes and Dodecanese)
Max TV (Nafplio) out of service
Mesogeios TV (Messenia)
New Television later Amfipoli (Serres) out of service
ORT (Pyrgos)
Sitia TV (Crete)
Star TV (Drama)
Super B (Patras and Western Greece)
TV 10 now FORMedia (Trikala)
TV Kosmos (Rhodes and Dodecanese)
XTV now Atlas TV (Chalkidiki, Imathia and Pella)
Zeus TV (Naxos) out of service

His signature talk shows Zougla and Kitrinos Typos would also be featured in the programming block. The main news bulletin was first hosted by Giorgos Karameros, and later, by Giorgos Noulas. The channel was renamed to AB Channel in summer 2014. On June 4, 2018, the channel was replaced with Extra Channel, as New Epsilon TV would start airing from its former frequency. Zoom TV was formerly included on Cosmote TV, on channel 664. The Greek version of BIB is currently available on Cosmote TV.

Programming
The list includes productions by Zoom TV. Most of the shows listed were cancelled in late 2013, with certain shows and presentators moving to Vriones' other stations, Extra Channel and E Channel.
Magazino Live – presented by Kim Kilian.
Atheatos Kosmos – news program; presented by Kostas Chardavellas.
O Palios einai Alios... – presented by Elda Panopoulou.
+Ergasia – presented by Matthildi Maggira.
Reportaz – presented by Petros Kousoulos.
Ego... o Enzo kai o Vincenzo – cooking show; presented by Vicenzo Zanny.
Perivallon SOS – presented by professor Panagiotis Christodoulakis.
Ta Asteria Spiti Sas – show about astrology; presented by Christos Ntoublis.
E-Shop – presented by Maria Siniori.
G Polywood – presented by Giorgos Polychroniou.
Weekend – presented by Marialena Andreou.
Nikites – presented by Katerina Zagoraiou.
Oti Kineitai – presented by Vasilis Sarimpalides.
Pare Kosme – presented by Yannis Papathanasis.
Treis laloun kai dio  – presented by Lampros Panagiotou.
Paikse Mpala
Ta Kounavia
Koritsia stin Priza – presented by Menia Koukou and Christianna Kochlatzi.
Makeleio 4 – presented by Stefanos Chios. (2013-2014)
Blog Box (2013-2014)
Antio gia Panta, den tha tous ksechasoume pote – presented by actor Vaggelis Tsigaras.
Ante Geia – presented by Takis Tsoukalas.
Zoom...e – presented by Maria Dimitreli.

References

External links

Greek-language television stations
Television channels in Greece